Chimelong Paradise is a major amusement park in Panyu District, Guangzhou, Guangdong, China. Opened on April 12, 2006, Chimelong Paradise is the largest amusement park in China and boasts the 10 Inversion Roller Coaster, which prior to the opening of The Smiler at Alton Towers, England shared the record for most inversions with Colossus at Thorpe Park in Surrey, England. It is classified as a AAAAA scenic area by the China National Tourism Administration.

Chimelong Paradise is part of Guangzhou Chimelong Tourist Resort which is operated by the Chimelong Group, a Chinese tourism company that also operates numerous other attractions, including Chimelong Ocean Kingdom, the Chimelong Safari Park and Chimelong International Circus. Chimelong Group reported that construction of the park cost over 1 billion RMB. Stretching over 60 hectares, the park currently contains more than 60 attractions and has a daily capacity of 50,000 visitors. The park is linked by a bridge to Chimelong Water Park, and some admission tickets include access to both parks.

On July 29, 2014, rare giant panda cub triplets, all three of which have thus far survived, were born at the Chimelong Safari Park.

Rides and attractions

Operating roller coasters

Former roller coasters

Themed areas 
Chimelong Paradise is split into 7 different themed areas with the following attractions.

Whirlwind Island 
 Half Pipe
 Rotating Cup
 Swiftly Chair
 Sombrero
 Bumper Car
 Music Flier

Screaming Zone 
 10 Inversion Roller Coaster
 Windshear
 Motorbike Coaster
 Jumping Machine
 Sky Rocket Roller Coaster

Happy Kingdom 
 Convoy
 Flying Tiger
 Helicopter Tower
 Double-deck Carousel
 Jumping Around
 Junior Jet
 Samba Balloon
 Fire Truck
 North Pole
 Sky Bicycle
 Skater
 Crazy Bus
 Sky Drop
 Sun & Moon Wheel
 Jumping Tower

Kids' Land 
 Ball Shooting
 Bravery Fire Fighting
 Rotating Honeybee
 Flying Saucer
 Turtle Paradise
 Noah's Ark
 Canoe River
 Mini Tug
 Kids Climbing Vehicle
 Small Swing
 Circus Train
 12 Horse Carousel

Rainbow Bay 
 Dive Coaster
 Giant Frisbee
 Young Star Coaster

Water World 
 Splash Battle
 Bumper Boat
 Shoot the Chute
 Pirate Raft

Phantom Zone 
 Rio (4D movie)
 Forest Temple
 Rain Forest
 Alien Attack

Transportation

Guangzhou Metro 
 Exit E of Hanxi Changlong Station on Line 3 and Line 7  are linked by a footbridge (3 minute walk) or free shuttle bus

Buses 
 Metro Line 9 feeder bus Hanxi Changlong Station - Panyu Village
 129 Jincheng Garden (Dongfeng East)
 302 Guangzhou East Railway Station
 303 Tianhe Bus Station
 304 Tangxia
 310 University City
 657 Dongpu Terminal

See also
 Chimelong Ocean Kingdom
 List of tourist attractions in China

References

External links

Chimelong group official website
Chimelong Paradise official website

Guangzhou Chimelong Tourist Resort
Amusement parks in China
2006 establishments in China
AAAAA-rated tourist attractions
Amusement parks opened in 2006
Panyu District